Shigeki Maruyama (丸山茂樹, Maruyama Shigeki; born 12 September 1969) is a Japanese professional golfer.

Career
Maruyama was born in Ichikawa, Chiba, Japan, near Tokyo. He attended Nihon University and turned professional in 1992. He is known for his ever-present smile on the golf course which has given rise to his nickname of the "Smiling Assassin". He began his career on the Japan Golf Tour, quickly becoming one of the leading players on that tour. Two excellent finishes in World Golf Championships events in 1999 helped to earn him membership of the U.S.-based PGA Tour for the 2000 season. He has three PGA Tour victories. At the end of the 2008 season he announced he was returning to Japan after failing to maintain full playing rights on the PGA Tour.

Maruyama was a member of The International Team in the Presidents Cup in 1998 and 2000. He had a 5–0–0 win–loss–tie record in the 1998 matches.

He has featured in the top 20 of the Official World Golf Ranking.

On 5 June 2000, he shot a first round 58 at Woodmont Country Club (South Course) in Rockville, Maryland while qualifying for the 2000 U.S. Open. This round ties the score achieved by Jim Furyk on the final round of the Travelers Championship on 2016.

Professional wins (15)

PGA Tour wins (3)

PGA Tour playoff record (1–0)

Japan Golf Tour wins (10)

Japan Golf Tour playoff record (1–0)

Other wins (2)

Results in major championships

CUT = missed the half-way cut
"T" = tied

Summary

Most consecutive cuts made – 5 (2001 PGA – 2002 PGA)
Longest streak of top-10s – 1 (three times)

Results in The Players Championship

CUT = missed the halfway cut
WD = withdrew
"T" indicates a tie for a place.

Results in World Golf Championships

1Cancelled due to 9/11

QF, R16, R32, R64 = Round in which player lost in match play
WD = withdrew
"T" = tied
Note that the HSBC Champions did not become a WGC event until 2009.

Team appearances
Amateur
Eisenhower Trophy (representing Japan): 1990

Professional
Presidents Cup (representing the International team): 1998 (winners), 2000
World Cup (representing Japan): 2000, 2001, 2002 (winners), 2003, 2004
Dynasty Cup (representing Japan): 2005

See also
List of golfers with most Japan Golf Tour wins

References

External links

Japanese male golfers
Japan Golf Tour golfers
PGA Tour golfers
Asian Games medalists in golf
Asian Games gold medalists for Japan
Golfers at the 1990 Asian Games
Medalists at the 1990 Asian Games
Nihon University alumni
Sportspeople from Chiba Prefecture
1969 births
Living people